W.T. David  M.A., Sc.D  (1886–1948) was Professor of Engineering  at Liverpool University from 1922–48 and from 1920-22 at University College, Cardiff in Wales. His pioneering doctoral research under Professor Bertram Hopkinson at Trinity College, Cambridge into flame gas phenomena  anticipated and was confirmed by later developments in quantum mechanics and David became an established authority on gaseous explosions in combustion engines. During WW1 he served as an Army Major (Research and Inspection) and in 1915 was appointed Director in the Ministry of Munitions and in 1918 Inspector of Technical Schools in the Ministry of Education. David was a member of the Institutions of Civil and of Mechanical Engineers, and was chairman of the Yorkshire Association of the Institution of Civil Engineers for the session 1928-29. He died in 1948.

Selected bibliography

References

1886 births
1948 deaths
Alumni of Trinity College, Cambridge
Academics of the University of Liverpool
20th-century Welsh educators
People from Laugharne
Alumni of Cardiff University
Academics of Cardiff University
English engineers